Rohini (रोहिणी) is a goddess in Hinduism and the favorite consort of Chandra, the moon god. She is a daughter of Daksha and sister of the 26 other Nakshatras. Of the lunar mansions, the asterisms Kṛttikā, Revati, and Rohini are often described as deified beings and “mothers”.

Lady Rohiniʻs name means “the red one”. She, as “the red goddess” (Rohini Devi), is the personification of Aldebaran.

Mythology
In Hindu mythology, Rohini is a daughter of King Daksha and Lady Panchajani. She is one of the twenty-seven daughters of Daksha who married Chandra, the moon god. She is the favourite and chief consort of Chandra. Chandra spent most of his time with Rohini, which enraged his other wives and they complained about this to their father. Seeing his daughters unhappy, Daksha cursed Chandra to lose his glory. Chandra's glory was partially restored by Shiva.

Rohini is the fourth nakshatra of the zodiac, ruled by the Moon. It spreads from 10° 0' in Vrishabha to 23° 20' in Vrishabha. Eyes of the people born in this nakshatra are especially attractive.

Lord Krishna's birth star is Rohini and it is believed there exists a significance in his choice to be born under the influence of this star.

References 

Hindu astrology
Daughters of Daksha
Hindu astronomy
Hindu goddesses
Nakshatra
Taurus (constellation)